was a bi-weekly manga magazine published by Shogakukan in Japan from 1979 to 1987. From 1976 to 1979, the magazine was titled  before being renamed Shōnen Big Comics in 1979. In 1987, the magazine changed format and was renamed Weekly Young Sunday. Several of the series appearing in Shōnen Big Comic have been adapted into anime, including Esper Mami, Area 88, and Miyuki.

Works

Manga-kun era
Series marked with a ♣ appeared in the first issue.

Bīdama Shachō by Kimio Yanagisawa ♣
Burai the Kid by Go Nagai ♣
Esper Mami by Fujiko F. Fujio ♣
Kokoroman by George Akiyama ♣
Kuru Kuru Pa! X by Yuki Hijiri
Kyūdo-kun by Shinji Mizushima ♣
Manga Kenkyūkai by Shōtarō Ishinomori ♣
Otoko Konbē by Mikio Yoshimori ♣
Propeller 7 by Leiji Matsumoto
Rabbit-kun by Tatsuhiko Yamagami
Saibō Ushi Usshī by Tatsuo Oda
Susume! Jets by Yuki Hijiri
Tatoru-kun by Fujio Akatsuka ♣
Teppengaki Taishō by Hiroshi Motomiya ♣
Uchūsen Magellan by Mitsuteru Yokoyama
Washi to Taka by Yū Koyama
Zero Racer by Jōya Kagemaru

The magazine also featured a non-manga column titled , which discussed construction of motorized toys such as radio controlled cars. The column was sponsored by Mabuchi Motor and Tamiya Corporation.

Shōnen Big Comic era
Ai ga Yuku by Yū Koyama
Area 88 by Kaoru Shintani
Cyborg 009 by Shōtarō Ishinomori
George-kun no Ningen Zukan by George Tokoro
Hadashi no Kabe by Motoka Murakami
Hatsukoi Scandal by Akira Oze
Henkīn Tamaidā by Go Nagai
Ichigekiden by Yasuichi Ōshima
Jūki Kōhei Xenon by Masaomi Kanzaki
Kaze no Saburō by Yū Koyama
Miyuki by Mitsuru Adachi
Nekketsu! Spectrum Gakuen by Yuki Hijiri
Ningen o Koerumono Ein by Kōichi Iimori
Seito Donmai by Hideo Hijiri
Short Program (some chapters) by Mitsuru Adachi
Sorairo Miina by Taku Kitazaki
Tōi Itadaki by Motoka Murakami
Tokyo Tanteidan by Fujihiko Hosono
War Cry by Ryūji Ryūzaki
Xenon by Masaomi Kanzaki
Yon-chōme Big League by Yoshimi Kurata

References

1976 establishments in Japan
1987 disestablishments in Japan
Biweekly magazines published in Japan
Defunct magazines published in Japan
Magazines established in 1976
Magazines disestablished in 1987
Semimonthly manga magazines published in Japan
Shōnen manga magazines